Praravinia is a genus of flowering plants belonging to the family Rubiaceae.

Its native range is Malesia.

Species:

Praravinia acuminata 
Praravinia affinis 
Praravinia borneensis 
Praravinia bullata 
Praravinia cauliflora 
Praravinia celebica 
Praravinia chalcotricha 
Praravinia coriacea 
Praravinia creaghii 
Praravinia densiflora 
Praravinia everettii 
Praravinia glabra 
Praravinia gracilis 
Praravinia hallieri 
Praravinia havilandii 
Praravinia hexamera 
Praravinia loconensis 
Praravinia loheri 
Praravinia longicalyx 
Praravinia longistipula 
Praravinia lucbanensis 
Praravinia megistocalyx 
Praravinia microphylla 
Praravinia mimica 
Praravinia minahassae 
Praravinia mindanaensis 
Praravinia mollis 
Praravinia montana 
Praravinia multinervia 
Praravinia negrosensis 
Praravinia neriifolia 
Praravinia nitida 
Praravinia panayensis 
Praravinia parviflora 
Praravinia polymera 
Praravinia pubescens 
Praravinia quadribracteolata 
Praravinia robusta 
Praravinia sablanensis 
Praravinia salicifolia 
Praravinia sarawacensis 
Praravinia sericotricha 
Praravinia stenophylla 
Praravinia suberosa 
Praravinia subtomentosa 
Praravinia teysmannii 
Praravinia triflora 
Praravinia urophylloides 
Praravinia verruculosa 
Praravinia viridescens

References

Rubiaceae
Rubiaceae genera